Recover is a cover album released by the American hard rock band Great White in 2002. All of the tracks are covers of songs that the band gained the most influence from. The album was recorded live in studio in November 1989 as a two-track demo. The collection of covers of this album include songs already appeared in other Great White albums, such as the medley "Bitches and Other Women" on ...Twice Shy, "Down at the Doctors" on Hooked and "Ain't No Way to Treat a Lady" on Let It Rock.
The covers of "Ready for Love" and "Fire and Water" are notable, as both were made famous by bands with Paul Rodgers as the lead singer. The former song was originally recorded by Mott the Hoople, whose guitarist Mick Ralphs was later in Bad Company and whose lead singer Ian Hunter originally performed "Once Bitten, Twice Shy", a major hit for Great White in 1989. The Dr. Feelgood song "Down at the Doctors" is misspelled in the credits as "Down to the Doctor".

Recover was issued with an altered order of the songs by the label Axe Killer in France in 2002, under the name The Final Cuts and in 2003 by Mausoleum Records with two bonus tracks, under the name Revisiting Familiar Waters.

In 2004, the Italian label Horizon-Italy re-issued the album with the title Burning House of Love, without the band's permission.  The compilation's title was considered to be in very bad taste, given that it was released just a year after The Station nightclub fire at a 2003 Great White concert.  The band has since condemned the label for illegally making this album, and has urged all fans not to buy it. The Italian label, on the other end, promptly changed the title to Love Removal Machine, without changing cover or content of the CD.

Deadline Records issued a double-CD deluxe edition of Recover in 2007, with a bonus CD containing tracks taken from other Great White albums and from tribute albums where Jack Russell had sung.

Track listings

Personnel

Band members 
Jack Russell – lead and backing vocals
Mark Kendall – lead guitar, backing vocals
Michael Lardie – rhythm guitar, keyboards, backing vocals, engineer
Tony Montana – bass
Audie Desbrow – drums

Production 
Melissa Sewell – assistant engineer

References 

Great White albums
2002 albums
2003 albums
2004 albums
Covers albums
Cleopatra Records albums